Great Clacton is a residential suburb of Clacton-on-Sea in the Tendring district of Essex, England. It is situated south east of the village of Little Clacton. The A133 road to Colchester from Clacton-on-Sea is directly west of this settlement. The Sunshine Coast Line goes round the town on the way to Clacton-on-Sea and the nearest station is Clacton-on-Sea railway station.

Great Clacton was founded by the Celts in c.100BC

The Saxons under their leader Clacc from whom the town gets its name set up residence, Clacc Inga Ton (the Village of Clacc's People).

Famous Residents

In the late 16th century the vicar was Eleazer Knox (d.1591) son of John Knox and Marjory Bowes of Norham.

References

Populated places in Essex
Clacton-on-Sea